June Fletcher is an American business and financial writer for The Naples Daily News. Her beat focuses on business, finance and real estate.

She formerly was a business and real estate reporter for The Wall Street Journal.

Early life and education
Fletcher was named Miss Bikini USA before entering Princeton University in 1969, the first year of coeducation. She received a bachelor's degree magna cum laude in English from Princeton. She also holds a master's degree from Oxford University in English.

Career
Fletcher was the "House Talk" columnist for WSJ.com from 2005 to 2008. Before becoming a columnist for The Wall Street Journal (WSJ), she was a staff reporter for 13 years. She is a regular contributor to the WSJ's "Weekend Journal", and is the columnist for House Talk. She is also a contributing writer for The Daily Beast, Yahoo!, and Financial Planning magazine. Before working for the WSJ, she was a senior editor at Builder magazine. She was Home Front reporter for The Wall Street Journal from 1995 to 2008.

Works
Fletcher is the author of a consumer book on buying and selling real estate titled House Poor, published by Collins.

References

Living people
Year of birth missing (living people)